The Maple Ridge Burrards are a Senior A box lacrosse club, based in Maple Ridge, British Columbia, Canada. The team competes in the 7-team Western Lacrosse Association (WLA).

History

The Burrards have undergone multiple name changes since their origination in 1937. Beginning in 1996, the team has been known as the Maple Ridge Burrards:
 1937–1937 Vancouver Burrard Olympics 		
 1938–1949 Vancouver Burrards 				
 1950–1950 Vancouver Burrard Westerns (merged with Richmond Farmers)		
 1951–1951 Vancouver Combines 				
 1952–1958 Vancouver Pilseners 				
 1959–1969 Vancouver Carlings				
 1970–1993 Vancouver Burrards (transferred to Surrey)
 1994–1995 Surrey Burrards (transferred to Maple Ridge)
 1996–present Maple Ridge Burrards

Retired Numbers

The following players have had their jersey numbers retired by the WLA Burrards club.
 1 - Walt Lee
 1 - Jack Green
 2 - Don Hamilton
 5 - John Cavallin
 14 - Harry Buchanan
 18 - Bill Chisholm
 21 - Roy Cavallin
 29 - Dave Evans

All-time record

External links
Maple Ridge Burrards Webpage
WLA Website

Maple Ridge, British Columbia
Western Lacrosse Association teams